Trabuco Canyon National Forest was established by the U.S. Forest Service in California on July 6, 1907 with  when the name was changed from Trabuco Cañon Forest Reserve and land was added. On July 1, 1908 the forest was combined with San Jacinto National Forest to create Cleveland National Forest and the name was discontinued.

References

External links
Forest History Society
Forest History Society:Listing of the National Forests of the United States Text from Davis, Richard C., ed. Encyclopedia of American Forest and Conservation History. New York: Macmillan Publishing Company for the Forest History Society, 1983. Vol. II, pp. 743-788.

Former National Forests of California
Protected areas established in 1907
1907 establishments in California
1908 disestablishments in California
Protected areas disestablished in 1908
Trabuco Canyon, California